The Mindanao treeshrew (Tupaia everetti), also called the Philippine tree shrew, is a species of treeshrew endemic to the Mindanao region in the Philippines. It was formerly considered the only member of the genus Urogale, but that genus was merged into Tupaia when the species was found to nest within the latter genus in a molecular phylogeny. The scientific name commemorates British colonial administrator and zoological collector Alfred Hart Everett.

Range and habitat
It is found, as its name suggests, in Mindanao, in the Philippines. It lives in rain forest and montane forest.

Description
It is the heaviest treeshrew, weighing about 355 g, and is terrestrial. The body is 17–20 cm, and the tail is 11–17 cm. It has a particularly elongated snout and a rounded, even-haired tail. The fur is brownish, but with orange or yellow underparts.

It is diurnal in its habits, and it climbs well and runs fast on the ground.

Diet
Its diet is varied. It includes insects, lizards, young birds, bird's eggs, and fruit.

Reproduction
In the wild, it is thought to nest on the ground or on cliffs. Their breeding habits have been observed in captivity, where females have produced one or two young after a gestation period of 54–56 days.

References

Macmillan Illustrated Animal Encyclopedia

Mammals described in 1892
Taxa named by Oldfield Thomas
Mammals of the Philippines
Treeshrews
Endemic fauna of the Philippines
Fauna of Mindanao